David C. Robertson (born ca 1960) is an American computer scientist, organizational theorist, Professor of Practice at the Wharton School of the University of Pennsylvania, and management consultant, known for his contributions in the fields of IT management and Enterprise architecture.

Biography 
After two years at Wesleyan University Robertson went to University of Illinois at Urbana–Champaign where he received his BA in computer engineering in 1982. In 1990 he received his PhD from the Massachusetts Institute of Technology.

After one year of postdoctoral fellowship (1990-1991) at the MIT Computer Science and Artificial Intelligence Laboratory, Robertson began a decade of industry work as an Associate Partner at McKinsey & Company. He directed the consulting firm ATG from 1996 to 1998, and was vice president marketing for a year at eCredit.com and a year at Baan, and another year CEO of Tradeffect. In 2002 he proceeded his academic career as Professor of Innovation and Technology Management at the International Institute for Management Development in Switzerland. Since 2010 back in the States he is Professor of Practice at the Wharton School.

Selected publications
Books:
 Ross, Jeanne W., Peter Weill, and David C. Robertson. Enterprise architecture as strategy: Creating a foundation for business execution. Harvard Business Press, 2006. 
 David Robertson with Bill Breen. Brick by Brick: How LEGO Reinvented its Innovation System and Conquered the Toy Industry. Crown Business, 2013.

Articles, a selection:
 David Robertson and Thomas Allen. "Managing CAD Systems in Mechanical Design Engineering." IEEE Transactions on Engineering Management, Vol. 39, No. 1 (February 1992): pp. 22–31.
 David Robertson and Nils Fonstad "Transforming a Company Project by Project: The IT Engagement Model." MIS Quarterly Executive, Vol 5, No 1 (March 2006).
 David Robertson and Per Hjuler, "Innovating a Turnaround at LEGO," Harvard Business Review, September 2009.

References

External links 
 David C. Robertson at robertsoninnovation.com
 David C. Robertson Practice Professor at wharton.upenn.edu

1960 births
Living people
American computer scientists
American business theorists
Place of birth missing (living people)
Wesleyan University alumni
Grainger College of Engineering alumni
Massachusetts Institute of Technology alumni
Wharton School of the University of Pennsylvania faculty